Golden Gate Transit (GGT) operates eight bus routes, including four Regional routes and four Commute routes. Schedules are updated quarterly to improve schedule reliability and efficiency. Route information listed below is current as of August 31, 2022.

Regional service

Golden Gate Transit operates four Regional bus routes, which provide daily service between San Francisco, Marin, Sonoma, and Contra Costa Counties.

Serving San Francisco via Civic Center

Serving the East Bay

Commute service
GGT operates four Commute bus routes, which operate during weekday peak periods only.

Serving San Francisco via Fisherman's Wharf

Early Bird Express service
GGT operates two Early Bird Express routes under contract with BART to replace early-morning train service during seismic retrofitting of the Transbay Tube.

Route 704 runs westbound only from El Cerrito del Norte Station to Salesforce Transit Center.

Route 705 runs westbound only from MacArthur Station to Salesforce Transit Center with stops at 19th Street/Oakland Station and at West Grand Avenue and Adeline Street in West Oakland.

Marin Transit service
GGT operates local service within Marin County on six routes under contract with Marin Transit. See Marin Transit for information on Routes 23, 23X, 29, 35, 36, and 71.

Discontinued service
GGT has operated several different bus routes over the years that have been discontinued or significantly altered.

References

External links
Golden Gate Transportation District

Golden Gate Bridge, Highway and Transportation District
Bus transportation in California
golden gate
San Francisco